Crossroad is an album by Calvin Russell, released in 2000. It was recorded at Lausanne's Bagdad Studio, in live conditions, in front of French speaking spectators.

Track listing
"Where The Blues Get Born"	3:07
"One Meat Ball" 	4:37
"Let The Music Play" 	4:21
"A Crack In Time" 	3:38
"Time Flies" 	3:35
"Soldier" 	4:54
"Little Stars" 	4:38
"Rats And Roaches" 	3:01
"Crossroads" 	4:59
"Behind The 8 Ball" 	4:51
"Sam Brown" 	5:13
"Wild Wild West" 	3:52
"This Is Your World" 	5:36
"That Wouldn't Be Enough" 	3:07
"I Gave My Soul To You" 	3:30
"Somewhere Over The Rainbow" 	5:22

External links
 Calvin Russell – Crossroad @ Discogs

Calvin Russell (musician) albums
2000 live albums
Live blues albums